SEX: Too Fast to Live Too Young to Die was a compilation album edited by Marco Pirroni, which was compiled from the records on the jukebox at Malcolm McLaren's shop SEX.

Track listing 
Psychotic Reaction - Count Five
Through My Eyes - The Creation
Ain't Got No Home - Clarence "Frogman" Henry
Shake Some Action - Flaming Groovies
You're Gonna Miss Me - The Spades
Liar Liar - The Castaways
In the Nighttime - The Strangeloves
Brand New Cadillac - Vince Taylor
You'd Better Move On - Arthur Alexander
I'm Eighteen - Alice Cooper
Night of the Vampire - The Moontrekkers
Monster in Black Tights - Screaming Lord Sutch
I Can't Control Myself - The Troggs
I Put a Spell on You - Screaming Jay Hawkins
Have Love Will Travel - The Sonics
Joue Pas Le Rock'n'Roll Pour Moi - Johnny Hallyday
The Pill - Loretta Lynn
We Sell Soul - The Spades
Valerie - Jackie and the Starlites
Roadrunner - The Modern Lovers

2003 compilation albums
Protopunk compilation albums